The following is a list of buildings at the University of Santo Tomas (UST) in Sampaloc, Manila.

The university sits on an almost perfect square of 21.5 hectares. The university transferred to its present campus in 1927 when the Dominicans deemed the Intramuros campus inadequate for the university's growing population. The first structures in the campus were the imposing Main Building, the Santisimo Rosario Parish, and the UST Gym. The Main Building and Central Seminary were declared National Cultural Treasures by the National Museum of the Philippines on January 25, 2010.

University facilities

Academic facilities

Administrative buildings

Libraries

Research centers

Athletic facilities

Religious buildings

Medical facilities

Demolished buildings

References 

Buildings
Santo Tomas
Educational structures in Metro Manila
University of Santo Tomas buildings